Gerard "Gerry" McDonald (born 27 July 1931) is a former Australian rules footballer who played with South Melbourne in the Victorian Football League (VFL).

Following his years in the Australian Football League, he returned to Warrnambool. In 1964 he married Maureen McDonald (née Gleeson), and had his first daughter in 1965.

Notes

External links 

Living people
1931 births
Australian rules footballers from Victoria (Australia)
Sydney Swans players
Warrnambool Football Club players